Keagan Kang (born 5 May 1976, in Perth, Western Australia) is an Australian actor living and working in Singapore.

Kang's first professional acting role was in Sweat. Soon after, a theatre director invited him to star in the stage play Rosencrantz and Guildenstern Are Dead in Singapore, and his career grew. Some of Kang's notable stage performances include Wit by Margaret Edson, Horst in Bent, Mercutio in Romeo and Juliet, and Gideon in Fairytaleheart. His film credits include City Sharks, No Through Road, Spoilt, and 2000 AD. Most recently Kang starred in the Australian-Canadian television series Stormworld, and the Australian film Woody Island.

Keagan also played a leading role in a Singapore legal drama series, Code Of Law, as a leading criminal defence lawyer, Jacob Fernandez. He is joined by Joanne Peh (Sabrina Wong), Mathialangan M (Sanjay Devaraj), Oon Shu An (Stephanie Szeto), Rosalyn Lee (Elaine Loh), Sunny Pang (Inspector Nick Han), Fauzie Laily (Inspector Razali), Jitenram Kiran Bala (Inspector Sam Dass), Michelle Wong (S.S Miki Lee), Ian Fang (S.S Issac Tan), and Desmond Tan (Serial Killer Derek Ho) and Cheryl Chitty Tan (Dr Winnie Low). In the 2020 final season, the cast of another Singapore legal drama series from 2012 The Pupil joins in; with Adrian Pang (Dennis Tang), Janice Koh (Angela Ang) and Rebecca Lim (Wendy Lim).

References

External links

1976 births
Male actors from Perth, Western Australia
Living people